The Canton of Guéret-Sud-Ouest is a former canton situated in the Creuse département and in the Limousin region of central France. It was disbanded following the French canton reorganisation which came into effect in March 2015. It had 5,177 inhabitants (2012).

Geography 
An area of farming and light industry in the arrondissement of Guéret, centred on the town of Guéret. The altitude varies from 350m (Guéret) to 690m (La Chapelle-Taillefert) with an average altitude of 491m.

The canton comprised 5 communes:
La Chapelle-Taillefert
Guéret (partly)
Savennes
Saint-Christophe
Saint-Victor-en-Marche

See also 
 Arrondissements of the Creuse department
 Cantons of the Creuse department
 Communes of the Creuse department

References

Gueret-Sud-Ouest
2015 disestablishments in France
States and territories disestablished in 2015